Auximobasis incretata is a moth in the family Blastobasidae. It was described by Edward Meyrick in 1931. It is found in Peru.

References

Blastobasidae
Moths described in 1931